Phil Husbands (born 27 June, 1961) is a professor of computer science and artificial intelligence at the English University of Sussex, situated next to the East Sussex village of Falmer, within the city of Brighton and Hove. He is head of the Evolutionary and Adaptive Systems group and co-director of the Centre for Computational Neuroscience and Robotics (CCNR). Husbands is also one of the founders of the field of evolutionary robotics.

His research interests are in long-term investigations of artificial evolution of nervous systems for robots, with emphasis on:

 visually guided robots acting in the real world 
 theoretical and practical development of advanced evolutionary algorithms for hard engineering and design optimisation problems
 development of biologically inspired artificial neural networks incorporating diffusible modulators 
 computational neuroscience
 computer manipulation of sound and image 
 history and philosophy of AI 
machine learning.

Husbands has edited several books, including coediting The Mechanical Mind in History (MIT Press; 2008) as well as author of numerous scientific articles. With neuroscientist Michael O'Shea he introduced the idea of GasNets artificial neural networks that use diffusing virtual gases as modulators. These are inspired by nitric oxide (NO) volume signalling in real brains. The Sussex team has also done pioneering work on detailed computational modelling of nitric oxide diffusion in the nervous system.

See also
 List of computer scientists

External links
 
 Phil Husbands
 Centre for Computational Neuroscience and Robotics (CCNR)
 New Scientist article on pioneering evolutionary robotics research by Husbands, Harvey and Cliff
 New Scientist article on Husbands' and O'Shea's introduction of the idea of GasNets
 Books by Phil Husbands in Google Book Search

Place of birth missing (living people)
1961 births
20th-century scholars
21st-century scholars
Academics of the University of Sussex
Artificial intelligence researchers
English computer scientists
English book editors
Living people
Researchers of artificial life